The NACAC U23 Championships in Athletics is an under-23 athletics competition held between the member associations of the North American, Central American and Caribbean Athletic Association (NACAC). Rules and regulations were approved at an extraordinary meeting of the members attending the XVIII Central American and Caribbean Games in Maracaibo, Venezuela held on August 18, 1998. First, the competition was open for athletes aged under-25. The Congress held on the island of Grenada on July 3, 2003, resulted in the reduction of the age limit for its bi-annual championships to athletes under-23 years of age in the year of competition.

Editions

Records

The following list is assembled from the following sources.

Men

Women

Mixed

Defunct events

Men

Women

* Under-25 championship records

See also
List of North, Central American and Caribbean records in athletics

References

External links
Full list of NACAC U-23/U-25 winners

U23
Under-23 athletics competitions
Recurring sporting events established in 2000
 
Continental athletics championships
Biennial athletics competitions